Damage is a song by Jimmy Eat World, included on their album, Damage (2013).

A two-track 7-inch single was first released on April 20, 2013 as a Record Store Day exclusive. Side A contains the title track "Damage" from the band's eighth studio album Damage. Side B features Jimmy Eat World's cover version of Radiohead's song "Stop Whispering". Only 1,800 copies of the EP were pressed (1,500 in the US and 300 internationally). The song impacted radio on August 6, 2013.

Track listing
All songs written by Jimmy Eat World, except where noted.

"Damage"
"Stop Whispering" (Radiohead cover)

References 

2013 singles
Jimmy Eat World songs
Record Store Day releases
2012 songs
RCA Records singles